The Mana is a river in Krasnoyarsk Krai, Russia, a right tributary of the Yenisey. 

The Mana is a popular place of rafting tourism, mostly on the calm, easily passable part of the river beginning from the Beret village or more difficult, from the village of Bolshoy Ungut. The place called Manskiy Plyos near Ust-Mana is very popular for holding various festivals, such as the traditional festival of bard songs.

Course
It flows northwest from the Eastern Sayan mountains. The upper river called Pravaya Mana is a typical mountain river having many rapids, the lower part is calm, winding among the high hills.

The river freezes over in the first half of November, ice breaking usually begins in the second half of April.

See also
 List of rivers of Russia
 Bazaikha
 Kacha (river)
 Krasnoyarsk

References

External links

Rivers of Krasnoyarsk Krai